The 1979–80 All-Ireland Senior Club Football Championship was the 10th staging of the All-Ireland Senior Club Football Championship since its establishment by the Gaelic Athletic Association in 1970-71.

Nemo Rangers entred the championship as the defending champions, however, they failed to qualify after being beaten by Castlehaven in the 1979 Cork SFC semi-final.

On 25 May 1980, St. Finbarr's won the championship following a 3-09 to 0-08 defeat of St. Grellan's in the All-Ireland final at Seán Treacy Park. It was their first ever championship title.

Walsh Island's Matt Connor was the championship's top scorer with 2-25.

Results

Connacht Senior Club Football Championship

Quarter-final

Semi-finals

Final

Leinster Senior Club Football Championship

First round

Quarter-finals

Semi-finals

Final

Munster Senior Club Football Championship

Quarter-finals

Semi-finals

Final

Ulster Senior Club Football Championship

Preliminary round

Quarter-finals

Semi-finals

Final

All-Ireland Senior Club Football Championship

Quarter-final

Semi-finals

Final

Championship statistics

Miscellaneous

 St. Grellan's won the Connacht Club Championship title for the first time in their history.

References

1979 in Gaelic football
1980 in Gaelic football